Fearsome Creatures of the Lumberwoods, With a Few Desert and Mountain Beasts is a 1910 fantasy field guide by William Thomas Cox (1878–1961), Minnesota’s first State Forester and Commissioner of Conservation, with illustrations by Coert du Bois (1881–1960; US Consul and forester) and Latin classifications by George Bishop Sudworth (1862–1927; Chief Dendrologist of the Forest Service.) The text is a noteworthy resource on folklore, as a century after its initial publication Fearsome Creatures remains one of the principal sources on legendary creatures of the United States and Canada.

Summary

The book presents various sketches of fearsome critters from North American folklore, with descriptions by Cox preceded by full-page landscape illustrations by du Bois. Like in a traditional field guide, each animal is assigned a Latin classification (by Sudworth), afterward noting their habitat, physical makeup, and behavior.  At the end of each account; however, there is usually a brief anecdote detailing an encounter with the creature.  Fearsome Creatures may be classified as a work of metafiction.

In the introduction, Cox acknowledges the varmints as, "animals which he [the lumberjack] has originated".  Although, given the books mixed field-guide narrative format it is uncertain whether the introduction is within or aside from the primary context. At times the storyteller (identified as Cox himself in the introduction) employs the more ambiguous woodsmen/loggers "tell of" or out comes the "rumor of", but other times declares to the reader that there "ranges" or "is" such a creature.

Publication history

First published in 1910 by the Press of Judd & Detweiler, Inc., Fearsome Creatures wasn't reprinted until half a century later when the full manuscript was included as a bonus in Walker D. Wyman's Mythical Creatures of the North Country. (River Falls, Wis., River Falls State University Press, 1969.) It was published on its own again by Bishop Publishing Co. in 1984. The following year it was again put into hard-copy by Kessinger Publishing. The original edition is in 35 United States WorldCat libraries.

Additionally, excerpts from Fearsome Creatures have been featured in a number of other publications, including:

 Tryon, Henry Harrington. Fearsome Critters. (Idlewild Press, 1939.)
 Botkin, B.A. (Ed.) A Treasury of American Folklore. (New York: Crown Publishers, 1955)
 Borges, Jorge Luis. Manual de zoología fantástic (Book of Imaginary Beings). (Argentina, 1957.)
 Dorson, Richard M. Man and Beast in American Comic Legend. (Bloomington, IN: Indiana Univ. Press, 1982.)
 Underwood, Muriel. Fearsome Critters: Folktales from the Forest and Desert. (Chicago, Miscellaneous Graphics, 1990.)

Historical connections

In the tradition of American tall tales and folklore, not all of the narrations are complete fabrications. Instead they are highly embellished stories elaborated on personal experiences.

In the narrative of Hyampom Hog Bear, a hog bear cub is found in Klamath River, California and taken by Eugene S. Bruce to the National Zoo in Washington D.C. This account is also recorded in The Land We Live In, The Book of Conservation by Overton W. Price. In this version Bruce did in fact catch a cub with his bare hands while trekking through the California mountains; the accompanying image stating underneath, "It [the bear] is now in the Washington Zoo, albeit the animal pictured is presumably not a hog bear.

Likewise, in the sketch of the snoligoster there is a reference to Inman F. Eldredge (1883–1963), a  Gifford Pinchot Medal awardee, who while pursuing an escaped fugitive in the everglades, encounters the dreadful swamp-wyrm which afterward devours the criminal.  An episode which is doubtlessly a fanciful idealization of Eldredge's background as a timber cruiser in Southern Florida.

Other persons referenced in Fearsome Creatures are John P. Wentling (1878-1952), who was Professor of Forestry at both the Pennsylvania State Forest Academy and University of Minnesota, A. B. Patterson (Forest Service), Big Ole Kittleson, Gus Demo, Bill Murphy, and John Gray.

See also
 Squonk
 Hugag
 Fearsome critters
 Legendary creatures
Cryptozoology

References

External links 
 Fearsome Creatures Of The Lumberwoods (1910) by William T. Cox from HathiTrust Digital Library (PDF)
 
 Fearsome Creatures of the Lumberwoods by Tim Cassidy (Pixel Issue #8, Pg. 17)
 The Splintercat

1910 books
Fantasy books